Qalandarabad is a village in Abbottabad Tehsil, Abbottabad District, Khyber Pakhtunkhwa, Pakistan.

References 

Populated places in Abbottabad District